Berryman may refer to:
BLIT (short story), or Berryman Logical Image Technique, a short story by David Langford
Berryman, Missouri, an unincorporated community

People:
Clifford K. Berryman, (1869–1949), American political cartoonist whose work spawned the Teddy bear
Dorothée Berryman (born 1948), Canadian actress and singer
Frank Berryman (1894–1981), Australian soldier
Guy Berryman (born 1978), musician of the group Coldplay
James T. Berryman, (1902–1971), American political cartoonist
Jim Berryman (born 1947), American politician from Michigan
John Berryman (1914–1972), American poet
John Berryman (VC) (1825–1896), English serviceman and recipient of the Victoria Cross
Lou and Peter Berryman, American folk singer-songwriters
Michael Berryman (born 1948), American character actor
Mildred J. "Berry" Beryman (1901–1972), American LGBT scholar
Paul Berryman, musician of Australian rock band The Superjesus
Phillip Berryman (born 1938), American theologian and author
William Berryman, 19th-century English artist active in Jamaica
Berryman Henwood (1881–1955), justice of the Supreme Court of Missouri

See also 
 Berriman (surname)